The 2016 FC Irtysh Pavlodar season is the 25th successive season that the club will play in the Kazakhstan Premier League, the highest tier of association football in Kazakhstan. Irtysh will also participate in the Kazakhstan Cup.

Squad

Out on loan

Transfers

Winter

In:

Out:

Trialists:

Summer

In:

Out:

Friendlies

Competitions

Kazakhstan Premier League

Regular season

Results summary

Results by round

Results

League table

Championship round

Results summary

Results by round

Results

League table

Kazakhstan Cup

Squad statistics

Appearances and goals

|-
|colspan="14"|Players away from Irtysh Pavlodar on loan:
|-
|colspan="14"|Players who appeared for Irtysh Pavlodar that left during the season:

|}

Goal scorers

Disciplinary record

References

External links
Official Website
Official VK

FC Irtysh Pavlodar seasons
Irtysh Pavlodar